DHK Baník Most is a women's handball club from Most, Czech Republic. In the 2019–20 season they made history by qualifying for the EHF Champions League group stage.
The nickname for the team is "Černí andělé" (Black Angels).

They are currently competing again in the 2022–23 Women's EHF Champions League.

European record

Results

National
Czech First Division: 9
: 2013, 2014, 2015, 2016, 2017, 2018, 2019, 2021, 2022
Czech Cup: 6
: 2014, 2015, 2016, 2017, 2018, 2020, 2022, 2023
WHIL: 3
: 2013, 2018, 2021, 2022

International
EHF Challenge Cup:
: 2013

Team

Current squad
Squad for the 2022–23 season

Goalkeepers
 21  Ellen Janssen 
 31  Dominika Müllnerová
 32  Jana Kašparová
Wingers
LW
9  Adéla Stříšková
 22  Lucia Mikulčík
 71  Sofie Behenská
RW
 33  Tereza Eksteinová
 73  Barbora Kroftová
Line players
8  Michaela Holanová
 91  Daria Somionka

Back players
LB
 11  Veronika Andrýsková
 14  Tatiana Šutranová 
 16  Ema Veselovská
 17  Adéla Pokorná
 25  Charlotte Cholevová
 28  Adéla Protivová
CB
 24  Valentina Schüllerová
 81  Katarina Kostelná
 96  Veronika Mikulášková 
RB
 38  Valeria Smetková
 74  Marie Poláková

Transfers 
Transfers for the 2023–24 season

 Joining

 Leaving
  Charlotte Cholevová (LB) (to  Brest Bretagne Handball)

References

External links
 Official website
 EHF Profile

Czech handball clubs
1997 establishments in the Czech Republic
Handball clubs established in 1997
Most District